Charge of the Model T's is a 1977 American comedy spy film directed by Jim McCullough Sr. with the screenplay by Jim McCullough Jr. based upon the novel of the same name by Lee Somerville.  Starring John David Carson, Carol Bagdasarian, Louis Nye, Herb Edelman, and Arte Johnson.

The final film of vaudevillian and actor George Mann, the project was shot on locations in Texas and in the Wichita Mountains region of Oklahoma near Lawton and Cache, and was distributed by MGM.

The film had both theatrical and television airings and, paired with The Switch, was released on DVD by VCI Entertainment on March 13, 2007.

Plot
During World War I, the Germans try to disrupt American war efforts by encouraging Mexican guerrillas to destabilize the Texas border with Mexico.  Masterminding the German plot is spy Friedrich Schmidt. As the border become disrupted, Friedrich drives into the United States at the wheel of the high-speed secret weapon: the "RX4", a Ford Model T equipped with armor and weaponry and tricked out with a powerful motor. US Army Lieutenant Matthew Jones pursues Schmidt with a fleet of special trackers.

Principal cast

Reception
The Evening Independent panned the film, making note that as the film was a "dull contrivance", G-rated did not stand for "good".

References

Further reading

External links

1977 films
American independent films
1970s English-language films
1970s spy comedy films
American spy comedy films
1970s war comedy films
American war comedy films
Films set in Texas
Films shot in Texas
Films set in Oklahoma
American World War I films
Films scored by Euel Box
1977 comedy films
1977 independent films
Films directed by Jim McCullough Sr.
1970s American films